Ilmo Severi Paananen (23 December 1927 in Sortavala – 10 October 2014) was a Finnish civil servant and politician. He served as the Minister of Labour from 13 June to 30 November 1975.

He was elected a member of the Parliament of Finland from 1966 to 1972, representing the Social Democratic Party of Finland (SDP).

He served as the mayor of Oulu from 1974 to 1990.

References

1927 births
2014 deaths
People from Sortavala
Finnish Lutherans
Social Democratic Party of Finland politicians
Ministers of Labour of Finland
Members of the Parliament of Finland (1966–70)
Members of the Parliament of Finland (1970–72)
Mayors of places in Finland
20th-century Lutherans